Saruq (also Romanized as Sārūq; also known as Qal‘eh-ye Sārūq, Qal‘eh-ye Bālā, Qal‘eh-ye Bālā Sārūq, Sārūqi, and Sūrakh) is a city  and capital of Saruqi District, in Farahan County, Markazi Province, Iran.  At the 2006 census, its population was 2,189, in 647 families.

References

Populated places in Farahan County

Cities in Markazi Province